Demetria Obilor is a television personality and former local news anchor. She is currently host of the Sporting News 7 podcast.

Early life

Obilor moved to Las Vegas with her family during her freshman year of high school in 2005. She graduated from Spring Valley High School then went on to the University of Kansas to earn a journalism degree.

Local news career

Obilor first became a traffic reporter in 2013 for KSHB-TV. Subsequently, Obilor worked for news stations in Las Vegas (KLAS-TV) and Dallas (WFAA).

In addition to her traffic anchor work for KLAS-TV, she also hosted and produced a social media segment called, "Trending now" and a franchised segment called, "What's Driving You Crazy?"

Body shaming incidents

Viewer comments about Obilor's appearance drew national attention on two occasions. In May 2017 Obilor shared a screenshot of an email from a KLAS-TV viewer. The email contained racist comments about her natural hairstyle.

Later, in November 2017, Obilor shared a KLAS-TV viewer's Facebook post that contained negative comments about Obilor's body shape. This incident garnered public support for Obilor from Chance the Rapper, Meghan McCain, and Gabrielle Union. Obilor responded to the incident by saying, "I don't care if a black woman wants to wear her hair straight or in braids, you don't get to say what's professional and what's not professional based on your white standard of beauty."

Work as media personality 
In 2022, Obilor transitioned to sports news as she began hosting the Sporting News 7 Podcast. The same year, Obilor became one of the hosts of Revolt's talk series, Black Girl Stuff.

References 

Living people
Television anchors from Las Vegas
Year of birth missing (living people)
21st-century American women